Octotropis is a genus of flowering plants belonging to the family Rubiaceae.

Its native range is India.

Species
Species:
 Octotropis travancorica Bedd.

References

Rubiaceae
Rubiaceae genera